Niels Bohr (1885–1962), Danish physicist who made foundational contributions to understanding atomic structure and quantum theory, is the eponym of the topics listed below.

Physics and Chemistry
 Bohr–Sommerfeld quantization, see Sommerfeld–Bohr theory
 Bohr–Van Leeuwen theorem
 BKS theory
 Bohr–Einstein debates
 Bohr complementarity principle, see complementarity principle
 Bohr correspondence principle, see correspondence principle
 Bohr frequency, see Bohr model
 Bohr magneton
 Bohr model
 Bohr model of the chemical bond
 Bohrium, the chemical element with atomic number 107
 Bohr orbital
 Bohr radius
 Sommerfeld–Bohr theory

Astronomy
 An asteroid, 3948 Bohr, named after him 
 Bohr (crater), a lunar crater

Other
 Niels Bohr Institute in Copenhagen
 Niels Bohr International Gold Medal
 Neil's Bahr, a popular comic and science-fiction based bar in Houston, Texas
 At the  CERN site in  Meyrin, close to Geneva, there is a street called Route Bohr in honour of Niels Bohr
 Niels Bohr Library & Archives of American Institute of Physics
 Cenotaph for Niels Bohr, a conceptual architecture project
 UNESCO Niels Bohr Medal

References

Bohr
Niels Bohr